The Laeaeans were a Paeonian tribe who in the 4th century BC lived adjacent to the Agrianes, another Paeonian tribe, along the upper course of the Strymon river, at the western edge of Thrace. They were not incorporated into the Odrysian state or the Paeonian state, remaining an independent tribe outside the borders of those kingdoms. According to Thucydides, the Laeaeans, along with the Agrianes, the Thracian Dii, and other tribes, joined Sitalkes in his unsuccessful campaign against Perdiccas II of Macedon. The coins issued by the Laeaeans are judged to be of crude workmanship, and seem to be imitations of finer minted coins issued by other neighboring Paeonian tribes such as the Derrones. A typical coin bears the inscription LAIAI (Laeaeans) on the obverse, and a Pegasus in a double linear square on the reverse. It is unclear whether or not the Laeaeans were conquered by Philip II or Alexander the Great, although their neighbors are recorded by historians such as Arrian as client kings.

References

Ancient tribes in Thrace
Ancient tribes in Bulgaria
Paeonian tribes